Bucakkışla is a village in Karaman Province, Turkey.

Geography
Bucakkışla is in the central ilçe district of the province at. It is on the way connecting Karaman to Ermenek. Göksu River runs south of Bucakkışla.

Population
The population of Bucakkışla consists of Yörüks (nomadic Oghuz Turks). Most of them are probably of Bıçakçı tribe. During the early Ottoman Empire era, they initially used the location as their winter quarters, and in the 19th century Bucakkışla became their permanent settlement. Although the village was declared a bucak center in 1930, which is administratively more important than a village, the population declined towards the end of the 20th century because of migration to cities. As of 2014, the population was as low as 166.

Economy
Main economic activity is greenhouse vegetable and fruit growing. Pomegranate, fig and olive are among the main products.

See also
Bıçakçı Bridge

References

Villages in Karaman Central District